Roland Frederick "Rowley" Fischer (24 February 1910 – 12 September 1992) was an Australian rules footballer who played with Melbourne in the Victorian Football League (VFL).

Fischer was born in Adelaide but recruited from Victorian club Murtoa. He represented the VFL at the 1937 Perth Carnival and again in 1939, for a total of five appearances. Playing in the back pocket, Fischer was a member of Melbourne's 1939 premiership team. He was also used as a ruckman and at centre-half forward during his career. Fischer missed Melbourne's 1940 premiership win after injuring his ankle in the preliminary final and he was also absent from their 1941 premiership team, with injury. He enlisted in the army in 1942 and didn't play again for Melbourne.

References

1910 births
Australian rules footballers from Victoria (Australia)
Melbourne Football Club players
Murtoa Football Club players
Australian Army personnel of World War II
1992 deaths
Australian Army soldiers
Melbourne Football Club Premiership players
One-time VFL/AFL Premiership players